KWD could refer to:

 Kellwood Company; New York Stock Exchange symbol KWD
 Kingswood railway station, Sydney, New South Wales, Australia; station code KWD
 Kirkwood railway station, Scotland; National Rail station code KWD
 Kuwaiti dinar, the currency of Kuwait by ISO 4217 code
 Kwaio language; ISO 639-3 language code KWD